Dmitri Olegovich Filimonov (born October 14, 1971) is a Russian former professional ice hockey defenceman. He played 30 games in the National Hockey League with the Ottawa Senators during the 1993–94 season. The rest of his career, which lasted from 1990 to 2006, was mainly spent in the Russian Superleague with Molot-Prikamye Perm. Internationally Filimonov played for the Soviet national team at the 1991 Canada Cup.

Playing career
Filimonov was drafted 49th overall by the Winnipeg Jets in the 1991 NHL Entry Draft, but remained in Russia with HC Dynamo Moscow and his rights were eventually traded to the Ottawa Senators in March 1993. He went on to play 30 regular season games with the Sens, scoring a goal and four assists for five points and collecting 18 penalty minutes during the 1993–94 NHL season, splitting the season between Ottawa and their AHL affiliate the Prince Edward Island Senators. He played one more season with P.E.I. before moving to the IHL with the Indianapolis Ice, but was hampered with injuries and only managed to play ten games. After one season in Finland for KalPa, Filimonov returned to Russia in 1997 to play for his hometown team Molot-Prikamye Perm, where he remained until his retirement from hockey in 2006.

Career statistics

Regular season and playoffs

International

External links

1971 births
Living people
HC Dynamo Moscow players
Indianapolis Ice players
KalPa players
Molot-Prikamye Perm players
Ottawa Senators players
Prince Edward Island Senators players
Russian ice hockey defencemen
Soviet ice hockey defencemen
Winnipeg Jets (1979–1996) draft picks
Sportspeople from Perm, Russia